Cléber Ferreira Manttuy (born March 24, 1982), known as Cléber, is a Brazilian footballer who played for clubs including Académica de Coimbra.

References

1982 births
Living people
Brazilian footballers
Marília Atlético Clube players
Associação Académica de Coimbra – O.A.F. players
Kallithea F.C. players
Association football defenders